Angela "Annie" Marie Peavy (born August 12, 1996) is an American dressage rider. She will be participating in the 2016 Summer Paralympics in Rio de Janeiro riding Lancelot Warrior.

Career
Peavy is partially paralyzed on her left side, due to a blood clot that affected her prior to birth. She began taking riding lessons at a young age, and as of 2016 is being trained by Heather Blitz. In 2014, she competed at the World Equestrian Games.

References

External links
 

1996 births
Living people
Paralympic equestrians of the United States
American dressage riders
American female equestrians
21st-century American women